Levan Gegetchkori (5 June 1994) is a Georgian professional footballer who plays as a defender for FC Dinamo Batumi. 

He is a member of the Georgia national football team. He made his debut in 2017 in a friendly game against Belarus.

Honours
Torpedo Kutaisi
Georgian Cup: 2022
Georgian Super Cup: 2018, 2019

References

External links

Dinamo Tbilisi official Profile

1994 births
People from Samegrelo-Zemo Svaneti
Living people
Footballers from Georgia (country)
Association football defenders
Georgia (country) youth international footballers
Georgia (country) under-21 international footballers
Georgia (country) international footballers
FC Merani Martvili players
FC Shukura Kobuleti players
FC Dinamo Batumi players
FC Chikhura Sachkhere players
FC Dinamo Tbilisi players
FC Metalurgi Rustavi players
FC Torpedo Kutaisi players